Hagins is a surname. Notable people with the surname include:

Emily Hagins (born 1992), American film director
Isaac Hagins (born 1954), American football player
Josh Hagins (born 1994), American basketball player
Montrose Hagins (1924–2012), American actress and schoolteacher

See also
Hagin